This is a list of flag bearers who have represented Madagascar at the Olympics.

Flag bearers carry the national flag of their country at the opening ceremony of the Olympic Games.

See also
Madagascar at the Olympics

References

Madagascar at the Olympics
Madagascar
Olympic flagbearers
Olympic flagbearers